Zygaena cacuminum  is a species of moth in the Zygaenidae family. It is found in Iran.In Seitz it is described This species reminds one in pattern of the carniolica-group, the 6. spot of the forewing being parallel to the distal margin. But the colour of all the spots of the forewing as well as of the hindwing is a dull purple, as it hardly occurs again in the whole genus. From Iran.

References

Moths described in 1870
Zygaena